Savannah Alfia Stubley is an English boxer. She participated in the 2022 Commonwealth Games in  Light Flyweight winning a bronze medal.

References 

Boxers at the 2022 Commonwealth Games
Commonwealth Games bronze medallists for England
2001 births
Living people
Commonwealth Games medallists in boxing
Medallists at the 2022 Commonwealth Games